The following is a list of Teen Choice Award Winners and Nominees for "Choice TV - Comedy". Friends receives the most wins with 6.

Winners and nominees

1999

2000s
In 2006, it was awarded as Choice TV Comedy/Musical (to include a TV movie into the category).

2010s

References

Comedy Series